B-sides & Live (2001–2005) is a compilation album by Echo & the Bunnymen, which was released on 3 December 2007 and initially only available as an MP3 download. It was later reissued physically for Record Store Day in 2022.

Track listing
"Marble Towers" (Bonus track from Japanese version of Flowers) – 4.05
"Scratch the Past" (Bonus track from Japanese version of Flowers) – 4.09
"Rescue" (Mindwinder's Remix) – 6.33
"A Promise" (Lo Fi Lullabye #1) – 5.16
"Supermellow Man" (Instrumental) – 5.34
"Ticket to Ride" 3.21
"What If We Are" (Vocal & String Version) – 5.09
"Stormy Weather" (Instrumental Version) – 4.31
"Make Me Shine" (Acoustic) – 3.12
"Nothing Lasts Forever" (Acoustic, Brazil) – 4.10
"In the Margins" (Instrumental) – 5.39
"Villiers Terrace" (Live) – 5.28
"In the Margins" (Live at Reading Festival 2005) – 4.56
"Nothing Lasts Forever" (Live at Reading Festival 2005) – 5.57
"Killing Moon" (Live at Reading Festival 2005) – 4.44
"Lips Like Sugar" (Live at Reading Festival 2005) – 4.30

References

Villiers Terrace.com The Ultimate Echo and the Bunnymen discography

2007 albums
B-side compilation albums
Cooking Vinyl compilation albums
Echo & the Bunnymen compilation albums